Li Qi is the name of:

Li Qi (emperor) (314–338), Cheng Han emperor during the Sixteen Kingdoms period
Li Qi (poet) (690–751), Tang dynasty poet
Li Qi (military governor) (741–807), Tang dynasty military governor
Li Xi (Tang dynasty) (died 895), Tang dynasty chief minister whose name can also be pronounced as Li Qi
Li Qi (Five Dynasties) (871–930), Later Liang and Later Tang minister during the Five Dynasties period
Li Qi (softball) (born 1983), Chinese softball player

See also
Liqi Subdistrict, a subdistrict in Hongta District, Yuxi, Yunnan, China